Christian Eric Chaney (born September 8, 1994) is an American soccer player who currently plays for Forward Madison FC in USL League One.

Career 
Chaney played college soccer at Fresno City College between 2011 and 2014. In the summer of 2012, Chaney played with Mexican side C.D. De los Altos as an amateur player. Chaney has also played with Premier Development League side Fresno Fuego, where was a candidate for the League MVP in 2016, after scoring 13 goals in 12 appearances.

After appearing in a friendly for Fresno Fuego against Armenian side Ararat Yerevan, Chaney was signed by the Armenian Premier League club.

Chaney returned to the United States when he signed with United Soccer League club Sacramento Republic on August 12, 2016. In September 2016, Chaney appeared for San Jose Earthquakes in a friendly match against C.F. Pachuca.

Chaney signed with newly hometown USL club Fresno FC on December 6, 2017.
Following a stint in Malta with Mosta F.C., Chaney returned to the United States on August 20, 2020, joining USL side Charlotte Independence.

Chaney returned to Fresno on January 27, 2022, signing with USL League One expansion club Central Valley Fuego.

Prior to the 2023 season, Chaney moved to fellow USL League One side Forward Madison FC.

Career statistics

Club

References

External links 
 Sacramento Republic FC player profile
 

1994 births
Living people
Sportspeople from Fresno, California
Soccer players from California
American soccer players
American expatriate soccer players
Association football forwards
Fresno Fuego players
Sacramento Republic FC players
Fresno FC players
FC Ararat Yerevan players
Mosta F.C. players
Charlotte Independence players
Central Valley Fuego FC players
Forward Madison FC players
USL League Two players
USL Championship players
Armenian Premier League players
Maltese Premier League players
American expatriate sportspeople in Armenia
American expatriate sportspeople in Malta
Expatriate footballers in Armenia
Expatriate footballers in Malta
Fresno City College alumni
College men's soccer players in the United States